Alfred Ernest Dear (30 September 1878 – 29 August 1906) was an Australian rules footballer who played for the Geelong Football Club and Essendon Football Club in the Victorian Football League (VFL).

Family
The son of John Dear (1846-1897), and Mary Dear, née Connolly, Alfred Ernest Dear was born on 30 September 1878. He died on 29 August 1906. His younger brother, Joseph Henry Dear, drowned in 1907, aged 12 years.

Collingwood full-forward Peter McKenna was his grand nephew.

Education
He was educated at Geelong College.

Football

Geelong (VFL) 
He played 22 games for Geelong over two seasons.

Essendon (VFL) 
Granted a transfer from Geelong to Essendon on 16 May 1900, he first played for Essendon in the round 5 match against Carlton on 26 May 1900.

In all, he played 6 games for Essendon.

In his last match, the round 10 match against Fitzroy at the Brunswick Street Oval on 7 July 1900, he was kicked in the chest in the third quarter of the match.

He never played again: "Alf Dear remained invalided from the injuries sustained in that game against Fitzroy and in 1906 he died at home in the darkened room he rarely left, his older brother Patrick by his side."

Footnotes

References 
 Donegan, J., "Footy History: The tragic tale of Alf Dear", The Footy Almanac, 20 May 2015.
 
 Maplestone, M., Flying Higher: History of the Essendon Football Club 1872–1996, Essendon Football Club, (Melbourne), 1996.

External links 
		

1878 births
1906 deaths
Australian rules footballers from Victoria (Australia)
Geelong Football Club (VFA) players
Geelong Football Club players
Essendon Football Club players
Newtown Football Club players
People educated at Geelong College
Sport deaths in Australia
Sports competitors who died in competition